Karl Brugmann (16 March 1849 – 29 June 1919) was a German linguist. He is noted for his work in Indo-European linguistics.

Biography
He was educated at the universities of Halle and Leipzig. He taught at the gymnasium at Wiesbaden and at Leipzig, and in 1872-77 was assistant at the Russian Institute of Classical Philology at the latter. In 1877 he was lecturer at the University of Leipzig, and in 1882 became professor of comparative philology there. In 1884 he took the same position at the University of Freiburg, but returned to Leipzig in 1887 as successor to Georg Curtius; for the rest of his professional life (until 1919), Brugmann was professor of Sanskrit and comparative linguistics there.

As a young man, Brugmann sided with the emerging Neogrammarian school, which asserted the inviolability of phonetic laws (Brugmann's law) and adhered to a strict research methodology. As well as in laying stress on the observation of phonetic laws and their operation, it emphasized the working of analogy as an important linguistic factor in modern languages.

As joint editor with Curtius of The Studies in Greek and Latin Grammar, he wrote an article for this work on “Nasalis Sonans,” in which he defended theories so radical that Curtius afterward disclaimed them.
Brugmann's fame rests on the two volumes on phonology, morphology, and word formation which he contributed to the five-volume Grundriss der vergleichenden Grammatik der indogermanischen Sprachen (“Outline of the Comparative Grammar of the Indo-Germanic Languages”), published from 1886 to 1893. The other three volumes were written by Berthold Delbrück and provided a still-unsurpassed account of Proto-Indo-European syntax. 
Brugmann's work overflowed the bounds assigned to it, so the first volume was split into two parts. With the indexes split off into a separate volume, the two volumes turned into four.

Realizing the importance of Brugmann's work, three British linguists began publishing an English translation of Brugmann's volumes almost simultaneously with the German edition, under the title Elements of the Comparative Grammar of the Indo-Germanic Languages. This divided Brugmann's second volume into two parts, making a total of five volumes including the indices.

Beginning in 1897, Brugmann began publishing a revision and expansion of his portion of the Grundriss. The final volume of the resulting second edition was published in 1916.

Brugmann's method in presenting his data was radical and can still raise eyebrows today. On most topics, instead of presenting discursive arguments, he simply listed the data which he felt were relevant. The reader was obliged to make up his own mind as to their interpretation. This totally empirical presentation multiplies the time necessary to follow Brugmann's argument, but makes the effort all the more fruitful.

Brugmann's great work did not come out of the blue. It was based on the previous Indo-Germanic grammar by August Schleicher, and that in turn on the previous effort of Franz Bopp. In addition, Brugmann stayed in touch closely with the scholars who were revolutionizing Indo-European linguistics for the daughter languages, in particular Bartholomae for Old Iranian, Hübschmann for Armenian, and Rudolf Thurneysen for Old Irish.

In 1902–1904, Brugmann published an abridged and slightly modified version of his Grammar, which is still considered a useful reference work by some but does not contain the wealth of data of the longer versions. A French translation of this abridged version exists.

The total list of Brugmann's works is much longer than this. Some of them were important in their time and some are still of continuing interest, but it is on the two editions of the Grundriss that his reputation rests. They remain indispensable to every Indo-Europeanist and of great interest to anybody interested in language.

Brugmann was knighted by the King of Saxony, and in 1896 he was invited to attend the jubilee of Princeton University, where he received the degree of doctor of laws.

Works
 Morphologische Untersuchungen auf dem Gebiete der indogermanischen Sprachen, with Hermann Osthoff (“Morphological Researches in the Indo-European Languages”; 6 vols.)
 “A Problem of Homeric Textual Criticism” (1870)
 “Lithuanian Folk Songs and Tales” (with August Leskien; 1882)
 Grundriss der vergleichenden Grammatik der indogermanischen Sprachen (1886) ("Elements of the Comparative Grammar of the Indo-Germanic Languages", 5 vols.)
 “The Present Position of Philology”
 “Greek Grammar
 “Short Comparative Grammar” (1902)
 "Die Syntax des einfachen Satzes im Indogermanischen" (1925)

With Wilhelm Streitberg, he founded the journal Indogermanische Forschungen (“Indo-European Research”)

References

 Sommer, Ferdinand (1955). "Brugman(n), Karl." In: Historische Kommission der Bayrischen Akademie der Wissenschaften (Hrsg.). Neue Deutsche Biographie 2: Behaim - Bürkel. Berlin: Duncker & Humblot. 1955. S. 667.
 Streitberg, Wilhelm: Karl Brugmann. In: Indogermanisches Jahrbuch. VII. Band, Jahrgang 1919, Berlin/Leipzig 1921, S. 143-152 (mit Schriftenverzeichnis).
 Wiese, Harald: Eine Zeitreise zu den Ursprüngen unserer Sprache. Wie die Indogermanistik unsere Wörter erklärt, Logos Verlag Berlin, 2007.

1849 births
1919 deaths
People from Wiesbaden
People from the Duchy of Nassau
Linguists from Germany
Historical linguists
Linguists of Indo-European languages
Academic staff of Leipzig University
Corresponding Fellows of the British Academy
Members of the Royal Society of Sciences in Uppsala